Alexander Archer Vandegrift (March 13, 1887 – May 8, 1973), was a U.S. Marine Corps four-star general. During World War II, he commanded the 1st Marine Division to victory in its first ground offensive of the war, the Battle of Guadalcanal. For his actions from August 7 to December 9, 1942 during the Solomon Islands campaign, he received the Medal of Honor. Vandegrift later served as the 18th Commandant of the Marine Corps. He was the first four-star general on active duty in the Marine Corps.

Early life
Alexander Archer Vandegrift was born on March 13, 1887, in Charlottesville, Virginia, where his father was an architect and contractor. Vandegrift was of Dutch ancestry, all of which had been in North America since the 1600s.  It was once facetiously remarked that he "never had a Catholic ancestor." The young Vandegrift, known as "Archer" in his boyhood, had an interest in the military both from reading military history novels and from stories of ancestors who fought in various wars. He graduated from Charlottesville High School. During his childhood, GE  was a big fan of G.A. Henty novels and history. In particular, he read a lot about the Battle of Trafalgar and the Battle of Waterloo and described himself as a "big fan" of Arthur Wellesley, 1st Duke of Wellington and Horatio Nelson.

He attended the University of Virginia from 1906 to 1908.

Early military career
He then received his commission in the U.S. Marine Corps through a week-long competitive examination in 1908.

He became a second lieutenant on January 22, 1909.

At the Marine Corps Schools in 1909, he wrote a prophetic article, "Aviation, the Cavalry of the Future." As commandant, he was appointed to the Hogaboom Board, named for Major General Hogaboom, the chairman, which began the Martine' development of vertical envelopment, the use of helicopters for air assault.  During his early years, as a second lieutenant, General Vandegrift was also very nearly dismissed from the Marine Corps for disciplinary infractions and negative evaluations. In his first Marine Corps evaluation, dated June 30, 1909, Vandegrift received an overall rating of "Not Good" with these remarks from the Commander of the Marine Officers School:
"This officer has not shown that he appreciates the responsibilities of his position as an officer, and unless there is a decisive improvement, his relations will not be to the advantage of the service."

In Vandegrift's next evaluation, in December 1909, he received a "Good and Tolerable" rating. The next was rated as "Excellent" upon reporting to the Marine Corps Barracks, Navy Yard, Portsmouth, New Hampshire, in 1910.

Banana Wars 

Following instruction at the Marine Officers' School at Port Royal, South Carolina, his first tour of duty was at the Marine Barracks at Portsmouth, New Hampshire. In 1912, he went to foreign shore duty in the Caribbean, first to Cuba and then to Nicaragua, where he participated in the bombardment, assault, and capture of Coyotepe Fortress. In 1914, he participated in the engagement and occupation of Veracruz, Mexico.

In December 1914, after his promotion to first lieutenant, he attended the Advance Base Course at the Marine Barracks, Philadelphia. Upon completion of schooling, he sailed for Haiti with the 1st Marines Regiment and participated in action against hostile Cacos bandits at Le Trou and Fort Capois, Haiti.

In August 1916, he was promoted to captain and became a member of the Haitian Constabulary at Port-au-Prince, where he remained until he was detached to the United States in December 1918. He returned to Haiti again in July 1919, to serve with the Gendarmerie d'Haiti as an Inspector of Constabulary. He was promoted to major in June 1920.

1920s–1930s

Major Vandegrift returned to the U.S. in April 1923 and was assigned to the Marine Barracks, Marine Corps Base Quantico, Virginia. He completed the Field Officers' Course, Marine Corps Schools, in May 1926. He was then transferred to the Marine Corps Base San Diego, California, as assistant chief of staff.

In February 1927, he sailed for China, where he served as operations and training officer of the 3rd Marines with headquarters at Tientsin. He was ordered to Washington, D.C., in September 1928, where he became assistant chief coordinator, Bureau of the Budget.

After his duty in Washington, he joined the Marine Barracks, Quantico, where he became assistant chief of staff, G-1 Section, Fleet Marine Force (FMF). During that assignment, in June 1934, he was promoted to lieutenant colonel.

Ordered to China in June 1935, Lieutenant Colonel Vandegrift served successively as executive officer and commanding officer of the Marine detachment at the American embassy in Peiping. Promoted to colonel in September 1936, Vandegrift reported to Headquarters Marine Corps (HQMC), Washington, D.C., in June 1937, where he became Military Secretary to the Major General Commandant. In March 1940, he was appointed Assistant to the Major General Commandant, and the following month, he was promoted to brigadier general.

World War II

Brigadier General Vandegrift was ordered to the 1st Marine Division in November 1941. Shortly before the U.S. entered World War II, he had become on December 7, the assistant commander of the First Marine Division.

In March and April 1942, Vandegrift was promoted to major general and assumed command of the First Marine Division. In May, the First Marine Division and the South Pacific Amphibious Force sailed for the South Pacific Area. The First Marine Division was the first Marine Corps division that ever left the shores of the United States. On August 7, Vandegrift led the First Marine Division in the first large-scale offensive action against the Japanese, in the Solomon Islands. He was awarded the Navy Cross "for extraordinary heroism and distinguished devotion to duty as Commanding General of the First Marine Division and all ground troops action with enemy Japanese forces during the attack on the Solomon Islands 7 August 1942." (attack on Guadalcanal, Tulagi, and Gavutu); He was later awarded the Medal of Honor "for outstanding and heroic accomplishment above and beyond the call of duty as Commanding Officer of the First Marine Division in operations against enemy Japanese forces in the Solomon Islands during the period 7 August to 9 December 1942." He had commanded the initial landings and the subsequent occupation ... that "resulted in securing a valuable base for further operations of our forces against the enemy." Vandegrift was presented the Medal of Honor on February 5, 1943, from President Franklin Roosevelt during a ceremony in the White House.

In July 1943, Vandegrift assumed command of the 1st Marine Amphibious Corps and commanded the organization in the landing at Empress Augusta Bay, Bougainville, in the northern Solomon Islands, on November 1, 1943. Upon establishing the initial beachhead, he relinquished command and returned to Washington, D.C., as commandant-designate.

Commandant of Marine Corps

On January 1, 1944, as a lieutenant general, he was sworn in as the 18th commandant of the Marine Corps. On April 4, 1945, he was appointed general, with date of rank from March 21, 1945, the first Marine officer on active duty to attain four-star rank.

During his tenure as commandant, the Marine Corps faced institutional threats from U.S. Army efforts to absorb the mission of the Marines. The U.S. Navy was sympathetic to the Marine Corps's predicament but was ready to accept the diminishment of the Corps in exchange for keeping naval aviation from consolidation with the U.S. Air Force. The post-war discussions on the restructuring of the American defense establishment opened the door to diminishing the mission and role of the Marine Corps in the new defense structure. Proponents of such cuts included President Harry Truman and General Dwight Eisenhower. In that power struggle, the Marine Corps aligned itself with U.S. Congress in warning against the encroachment on civilian oversight within the Army proposals.

To clinch the support of Congress, Commandant Vandegrift delivered the famous "Bended Knee Speech" on May 6, 1946 to the Senate Committee on Naval Affairs and ended it thus:

For outstanding service as Commandant of the Marine Corps from January 1, 1944 to June 30, 1946, General Vandegrift was awarded the Navy Distinguished Service Medal. He left active service on December 31, 1947 and was placed on the retired list on April 1, 1949.

Later life
Together with Robert B. Asprey, General Vandegrift co-authored a book chronicling his experiences in World War II. The book is titled Once a Marine: The Memoirs of General A. A. Vandegrift Commandant of the U.S. Marines in WW II, and was published in 1964.

General Vandegrift died on May 8, 1973, at the National Naval Medical Center, Bethesda, Maryland, after a long illness. His interment was on May 10, 1973, at the Arlington National Cemetery.
Dates of rank

Military awards
Vandegrift received the following decorations and awards: 
 

Medal of Honor citation
Vandegrift's Medal of Honor citation reads as follows:

The President of the United States takes pleasure in presenting the MEDAL OF HONOR to

for service as set forth in the following CITATION:

For outstanding and heroic accomplishment above and beyond the call of duty as commanding officer of the 1st Marine Division in operations against enemy Japanese forces in the Solomon Islands during the period from 7 August to 9 December 1942. With the adverse factors of weather, terrain, and disease making his task a difficult and hazardous undertaking, and with his command eventually including sea, land, and air forces of Army, Navy and Marine Corps, Maj. Gen. Vandegrift achieved marked success in commanding the initial landings of the U. S. forces in the Solomon Islands and in their subsequent occupation. His tenacity, courage, and resourcefulness prevailed against a strong, determined, and experienced enemy, and the gallant fighting spirit of the men under his inspiring leadership enabled them to withstand aerial, land, and sea bombardment, to surmount all obstacles, and leave a disorganized and ravaged enemy. This dangerous but vital mission, accomplished at the constant risk of his life, resulted in securing a valuable base for further operations of our forces against the enemy, and its successful completion reflects great credit upon Maj. Gen. Vandegrift, his command, and the U.S. Naval Service.

/S/ Franklin D. Roosevelt

Navy Cross citation
Citation:
The President of the United States of America takes pleasure in presenting the Navy Cross to Major General Alexander Archer Vandegrift (MCSN: 0-1009), United States Marine Corps, for extraordinary heroism and distinguished devotion to duty as Commander of the FIRST Marine Division and all ground troops in action with enemy Japanese forces during the attack on the Solomon Islands on 7 August 1942. Though subjected to intense enemy opposition, Major General Vandegrift led his command in superbly coordinated operations with the result that all objectives were captured and opposing enemy Japanese forces destroyed. His fine spirit of leadership and his courageous determination throughout the engagement were in keeping with the highest traditions of the United States Naval Service.

Namesake and other honors
General Vandegrift held an honorary degree of Doctor of Military Science from Pennsylvania Military College and honorary degrees of Doctor of Law from Harvard, Colgate, Brown, Columbia, and Maryland Universities and John Marshall College.

In 1982, the frigate,  was named in his honor.

The main street that runs through Camp Pendleton is named Vandegrift Boulevard in his honor.

A former military housing complex, now civilian housing, for Wright-Patterson Air Force Base, near Dayton, Ohio, has streets named for World War II commanders including General Vandegrift, General Eisenhower, and Admiral Nimitz.

Family
Vandegrift married Mildred Strode (1886–1952) on June 29, 1909.  They had one son, Alexander Archer Vandegrift, Jr. (1911–1969), a Marine Corps colonel who fought in both World War II and in the Korean War.  After Mildred's death, he married Kathryn Henson (1903–1978).

In popular culture
Vandegrift was portrayed in the 1960 film The Gallant Hours by Raymond Bailey, the 2006 film Flags of Our Fathers by Chris Bauer, and the 2010 miniseries The Pacific by Stephen Leeder. He also appears as in the 2016 video game Hearts of Iron IV.

A fictionalized account of Vandegrift and the U.S. Marines on Guadalcanal is featured in The Corps series by W.E.B. Griffin.

Vandegrift appears in the 2004 anime series Zipang''.

See also

 List of United States Marine Corps four-star generals
 Pacific theatre
 Solomon Islands campaign

Notes

References

Books

Web

External links

1887 births
1973 deaths
Burials at Arlington National Cemetery
American people of Dutch descent
Knights Grand Cross of the Order of Orange-Nassau
United States Marine Corps Medal of Honor recipients
Recipients of the Navy Cross (United States)
Recipients of the Navy Distinguished Service Medal
American military personnel of the Banana Wars
People from Charlottesville, Virginia
United States Marine Corps Commandants
United States Marine Corps World War II generals
United States Marine Corps generals
Honorary Companions of the Order of the Bath
Honorary Knights Commander of the Order of the British Empire
Grand Officiers of the Légion d'honneur
Recipients of the Order of the Sacred Tripod
World War II recipients of the Medal of Honor
United States Marine Corps personnel of World War I